Shibrou Regassa (born 9 August 1944) is an Ethiopian middle-distance runner. He competed in the men's 800 metres at the 1972 Summer Olympics.

References

External links
 

1944 births
Living people
Athletes (track and field) at the 1972 Summer Olympics
Ethiopian male middle-distance runners
Olympic athletes of Ethiopia
Place of birth missing (living people)
African Games medalists in athletics (track and field)
African Games bronze medalists for Ethiopia
Athletes (track and field) at the 1973 All-Africa Games
20th-century Ethiopian people
21st-century Ethiopian people